George Hearn (born June 18, 1934) is an American actor and singer, primarily in Broadway musical theatre.

Early years
Born in St. Louis, Missouri, Hearn studied philosophy at Southwestern at Memphis, now Rhodes College before he embarked on a career in the theater, training for the stage with actress turned acting coach Irene Dailey. Most of Hearn's early performances were in traditional productions at the New York Shakespeare Festival and theaters at Lincoln Center.

Career
Hearn's career began in 1963 when he played Sir Dinidan in a national tour of Camelot with Biff McGuire and Jeannie Carson, standing by for McGuire, who played King Arthur. He first garnered a notice as John Dickinson in the acclaimed 1969 musical 1776 and as Liv Ullmann's leading man in the musical version of I Remember Mama (1979).

On March 4, 1980, he replaced Len Cariou in the title role of Stephen Sondheim's Sweeney Todd opposite Dorothy Loudon. Later in 1980 Hearn and the show's original star, Angela Lansbury, headed the show's touring company, then reprised their roles for a Showtime production of the musical, which won him an Emmy Award for his portrayal.

In 1983 Hearn created the role of Albin in the original Broadway production of La Cage aux Folles written by Harvey Fierstein and Jerry Herman. Hearn originated the gay anthem "I Am What I Am". He won the Tony Award, Drama Desk Award and Outer Critics' Circle Award for Best Actor in a Musical for his portrayal of Albin. Hearn also appeared in the West End production (which opened in May 1986).

In 1985, Hearn starred as Long John Silver in an Edmonton production of Pieces of Eight, a musical adaptation of Treasure Island. Despite its credentials, including composer Jule Styne, it never was staged again.

Hearn and Lansbury remained friends, and the actress invited him to guest star on several episodes of her CBS sleuth series Murder, She Wrote in the early 1990s.

He won a second Tony award for his role as Max Von Mayerling in the original Broadway production of Sunset Boulevard, and was nominated again for playing Otto Frank in the 1997 revival of The Diary of Anne Frank.

On July 20, 2004, Hearn returned to Broadway for the first time in four years, starring as the Wizard in the Broadway musical Wicked, remaining until May 29, 2005. Hearn later returned to the musical for a limited two-week engagement from January 17 through February 1, 2006.

In 2008 he starred in a production of The Visit by John Kander and Fred Ebb alongside Chita Rivera at the Signature Theatre in Arlington, Virginia. The Visit opened to positive reviews on May 13, 2008, and closed June 22, 2008.

Hearn's recordings include Sunset Boulevard (1994 Los Angeles Cast, and later the Broadway Cast Recording), Sweeney Todd Live at the New York Philharmonic, Mack & Mabel (1988 London Concert Cast), I Remember Mama (1985 Studio Cast), Follies in Concert (1985 Live Performance), and A Stephen Sondheim Evening (1983 Concert Cast).

Hearn was inducted into the American Theater Hall of Fame on January 29, 2007.

Personal life
Hearn's spouses include Susan Babel, Mary Harrell, with whom he had one son; Dixie Carter (1977–1979); girlfriend Betsy Joslyn (1979–1984); and current wife Leslie Simons. Hearn and Simons have two sons. He currently resides in Essex, New York.

Filmography

Film

Television

Stage

Awards and nominations

References

External links

1934 births
Living people
Rhodes College alumni
American male film actors
American male television actors
American baritones
American male musical theatre actors
American male stage actors
American male voice actors
Drama Desk Award winners
Emmy Award winners
Tony Award winners
20th-century American male actors
21st-century American male actors
20th-century American singers
21st-century American singers
People from Essex, New York
20th-century American male singers
21st-century American male singers